Azaru is a village in the Astara Rayon of Azerbaijan. The village forms part of the municipality of Asxanakəran.

References 

Populated places in Astara District

ku.Azarû